Adherents of Jainism first settled in Canada in small numbers in the late 19th century. The number of Jains in Canada later increased, leading to the establishment of Jain temples in Canada. The type of Jainism in Canada later exhibited several differences from Jainism in India.

History
The number of Jains in Canada greatly increased in the 1970s due to the liberalization of Canada's immigration laws. This has allowed for a community of Jain immigrants to become established in Canada, where they have formed a unique spiritual and cultural identity. Most Canadian Jains now live in Ontario, particularly Toronto.

First temple
The first Jain society in the Toronto area was formed in 1974. At that time, there were approximately 150 Jain families in the region. A Jain religious centre was first officially established in Toronto in 1988 when the Jain society purchased a Church building and converted it into a temple. The temple served both the Svetambara and Digambar communities, whose theology and religious practice differs in some aspects.

A new temple is under construction in Scarborough, which, once completed in 2016, will be the largest Jain temple in North America.

Themes in Canadian Jainism
Canadian Jainism differs from Jainism in India in part due to the lack of Jain ascetics. In India, ascetics often promote sect loyalty and religious orthodoxy. This difference has promoted a more non-sectarian Jain identity which allows for diversity of beliefs. Some Jains have argued that this leads to a less authentic version of Jainism. Others have applauded the way that Canadian Jainism promotes a more casteless modern interpretation of the religion. In the Gujarati community Jains have become integrated with Hindus, and have often served together on community projects.

Many Canadian Jains actively promote vegetarianism, meditation, and interfaith dialogue.

See also

 Brampton Jain Temple
 Jainism in the United States
 Jainism in Europe
 Jainism in Hong Kong
 Jainism in Singapore

Notes

References

 
Jain communities